"Man's Best Friend" is an episode from the second season of the American animated television series The Ren and Stimpy Show.  It was originally intended to air on Nickelodeon on August 22, 1992 as the second half of the second episode of Season 2, but was pulled before airing and replaced by the original theatrical pilot. It eventually aired on the soft launch of Spike TV on June 23, 2003. In the episode, Ren and Stimpy (voiced by John Kricfalusi and Billy West) learn about obedience after George Liquor (voiced by Michael Pataki) takes them home with him and swears to make them "champions".

The episode was deemed controversial for the violent scene where Ren beats George with an oar on-screen, along with tobacco references and a joke about feces, and Nickelodeon refused to carry it in its original form, terminating series creator John Kricfalusi and his production company Spümcø from further involvement in the series at the time.

Plot
One day, George Liquor is standing outside of a pet store, watching Ren and Stimpy sleep in the window and gets the idea to adopt them as his pets. Upon arriving home with Ren and Stimpy, he finds a home for them by emptying a fish bowl containing a fish, which then flops out the door and leaves in George's car.

The next day, Ren and Stimpy awaken to find George Liquor dressed as a drill sergeant to train them to be proper pets. Their first lesson is house training by doing push-ups using their buttocks on a newspaper. Ren fails, but Stimpy succeeds while reading about mudslides. He is given a cigar-shaped dog treat as a reward.

Next, they are taught discipline. In order to learn discipline, they are taught to disobey. George Liquor tells them not to go near the couch, then instructs them to do so in order to be punished. When he begins to become enraged by them not following his orders, Ren collapses to the floor sobbing, and a terrified Stimpy jumps onto the couch as George had instructed, only to be yelled at. Stimpy becomes scared, thinking he is going to be punished. Instead, George compliments him for following orders and gives him another dog treat. George then instructs Ren to ask him for punishment. After Ren does so, George insists that Ren is too "soft" for punishment and instead gives him 20 dollars and tells him to take the car and see a movie. Ren points out that the fish already took the car, which appears to enrage George. Instead, he gives Ren another 20 dollars for backtalking him.

Lastly, George teaches them to protect their "master". Before they learn to defend, they are taught to attack. Wearing a padded suit, he urges the two of them to attack him. Stimpy refuses because George is his "kind and beloved master", but Ren, who is sick of George Liquor and their treatment, picks up an oar and maniacally begins beating him up with it, much to Stimpy's horror. Again, Ren expects George to be enraged. Instead, he is impressed and calls him a champion and produces cigar-shaped treats for all of them. The episode ends with the three of them dancing with the cigar-shaped treats clamped between their teeth.

Production
Produced for the show's second season, the story for the episode was written by the storyboard artist Vincent Waller and series creator John Kricfalusi, who also served as the episode's director, with storyboards provided by Chris Reccardi. This is the first episode where George Liquor is voiced by Michael Pataki; previously, he was portrayed by Harris Peet. This episode was meant to take place before "Dog Show", as George had apparently trained the duo by that point. Originally, a scene where George Liquor leg-wrestles with Ren and Stimpy was going to be in this episode, but never got past the storyboards. After Spumco was fired, Games Animation eventually produced it using archive audio and Rough Draft Korea's animation services. Ultimately, legal troubles with John Kricfalusi's ownership of George Liquor prevented them from ever airing the footage.

Controversy
It was scheduled to air on August 22, 1992 by Nickelodeon, but the channel refused to air it due to one violent scene in which Ren beats up George with an oar, as well as references to tobacco and brief scatological humor. Following the episode's ban, Nickelodeon fired John Kricfalusi and the rest of Spümcø in order to make the show appropriate for younger viewers according to Kricfalusi himself, but this is not entirely the case; the relationship between John and Nickelodeon had in fact been tense for quite some time beforehand due to John's perfectionism resulting in multiple episodes missing their scheduled airdates, with "Man's Best Friend" merely being the straw that broke the camel's back in this regard. Following this, Games Animation handled the show starting with its third season, with Billy West, Stimpy's voice actor, replacing Kricfalusi's role as the voice of Ren.

However, Kricfalusi was hired for Viacom years later, creating the short-lived Ren & Stimpy "Adult Party Cartoon" for the Spike TV network during its animation block. The banned episode could finally be aired, along with the uncut version of the original Ren & Stimpy pilot episode "Big House Blues", as part of the adult-oriented spin-off/reboot of the series with a TV-MA rating.

The episode was also released on Ren & Stimpys first and second season DVD boxset, as a bonus feature.

Reception
Author Thad Komorowski gave it five out of five stars in his Sick Little Monkeys: The Unauthorized Ren & Stimpy Story book, calling it "one of the most wonderful and insane cartoons of the series".

References

External links

1992 American television episodes
Animated television episodes
The Ren & Stimpy Show
Publisher censorship
Animation controversies in television
Television controversies in the United States
Television episodes pulled from general rotation
Unaired television episodes